Sandy Cohen III (born September 22, 1995) is an American-Israeli professional basketball player Bnei Herzliya of the Israeli Basketball Premier League. A standout at Seymour Community High School who led the team to two Bay Conference championships, Cohen played college basketball for Marquette University and later the University of Wisconsin–Green Bay. Cohen went undrafted in the 2019 NBA Draft, and signed a four-year contract with Maccabi Tel Aviv in August 2019.

Early life and high school career
Cohen was born in Green Bay, Wisconsin, U.S. to Linda King and Sandy Cohen, Jr. Cohen's family are members of the Oneida Nation of Wisconsin, and he is of Jewish descent through his father. Cohen has 3 siblings, including Connecticut Sun player Natisha Hiedeman. 

He attended Seymour Community High School, winning two Bay Conference championships in 2012 and 2014, and receiving First Team All-Conference honors twice. Cohen led the Bay in points per game his senior year, and was named Bay Conference Player of the Year. Cohen also received an All-State Honorable Mention from the Wisconsin Basketball Coaches Association his junior year. After his senior season, Cohen ranked as a top-100 consensus recruit (83rd by ESPN, 87th by Scout.com, and 97th by Rivals.com).

College career

Marquette (2014–2017) 
Cohen enrolled at Marquette University for the 2014–2015 season, coming mostly off the bench. His career highs his freshman season were 12 points, six rebounds, and 31 minutes. His sophomore season, Cohen set career records of 24 points, eight assists, and 36 minutes. Citing a desire to play more and have a larger role on the team, Cohen requested to be released from his scholarship at Marquette in November 2016 after playing three games of his junior season. He subsequently announced he would be transferring to Green Bay.

Green Bay (2017–2019) 
Due to NCAA transfer rules, Cohen was to sit out the 2016–17 season and would have had only one year of eligibility remaining. In October 2017, Cohen was granted an NCAA waiver, which provided an extra year of eligibility. Cohen's first appearance with Green Bay was on December 21, 2017 against Bowling Green State University, scoring 16 points and grabbing six rebounds. His redshirt junior season in 2017–18 saw Cohen increase his career high in points to 36, receive Horizon League Player of the Week honors for the week of February 22, and lead the Horizon League in steals (1.8 SPG) while ranking sixth in scoring with 17.1 points per game.

His redshirt senior season, Cohen led the Phoenix in all statistical categories, set Green Bay's single-season scoring record at 666 points, and received multiple awards and accolades from the Horizon League and beyond.

Professional career

Maccabi Tel Aviv
Cohen went undrafted in the 2019 NBA draft, and played for the Cleveland Cavaliers in the NBA Summer League, while also working out with the Minnesota Timberwolves and Indiana Pacers. On August 12, 2019, Cohen signed a four-year contract with Maccabi Tel Aviv of the Israeli Premier League.

Beni Herzliya
On July 14, 2021, Cohen was loaned from Maccabi Tel Aviv to Beni Herzliya, along with guard Dori Sahar. On July 8, 2022, he signed a 1+1 contract extenion with Beni Herzliya.

Personal life
Due to his father's Jewish background, Cohen was naturalized as an Israeli citizen in May 2020.

Career statistics

College

|-
| style="text-align:left;"| 2014–15
| style="text-align:left;"| Marquette
| 31 || 7 || 15.0 || .371 || .333 || .607 || 1.6 || .8 || .5 || .2 || 3.8
|-
| style="text-align:left;"| 2015–16
| style="text-align:left;"| Marquette
| 32 || 15 || 23.3 || .439 || .355 || .741 || 3.2 || 1.8 || .8 || .4 || 5.9
|-
| style="text-align:left;"| 2016–17
| style="text-align:left;"| Marquette
| 3 || 0 || 6.3 || .000 || .000 || .000 || 1.0 || .3 || .0 || .7 || .0
|-
| style="text-align:left;"| 2017–18
| style="text-align:left;"| Green Bay
| 22 || 20 || 33.0 || .474 || .349 || .709 || 5.7 || 2.5 || 1.5 || .6 || 16.1
|-
| style="text-align:left;"| 2018–19
| style="text-align:left;"| Green Bay
|38 || 37 || 34.1 || .475 || .337 || .773 || 6.4 || 4.7 || 1.9 || 1.1 || 17.5
|-
|- class="sortbottom"
| style="text-align:center;" colspan="2" | Career
| 126 || 80 || 25.8 || .457 || .343 || .739 || 4.1 || 2.5 || 1.1 || .6 || 10.5

Source: RealGM

Awards and honors

High school
 2× Bay Conference championship (2012, 2014)
 2× Bay Conference First Team (2013, 2014)
 Bay Conference Second Team (2012)
 Bay Conference Player of the Year (boys basketball, 2014)
 All-State Honorable Mention, Wisconsin Basketball Coaches Association (2014)
 Consensus top-100 recruit

College
 3× Horizon League Player of the Week (men's basketball)
 First Team All-Horizon League (2019)
 Green Bay Phoenix single-season record holder in points (666)
 CollegeInsider.com Postseason Tournament All-Tournament Team (2019)
 Hugh Durham Classic MVP

References

External links
 Green Bay Phoenix bio
 Marquette Golden Eagles bio
 RealGM profile

1995 births
Living people
21st-century American Jews
American expatriate basketball people in Israel
American men's basketball players
Bnei Hertzeliya basketball players
Native American basketball players
Basketball players from Wisconsin
Green Bay Phoenix men's basketball players
Jewish American sportspeople
Jewish men's basketball players
Maccabi Tel Aviv B.C. players
Marquette Golden Eagles men's basketball players
Oneida people
People from Seymour, Wisconsin
Shooting guards
Small forwards